East Branch Handsome Brook is a river in Delaware County, New York. It flows into Handsome Brook south of Franklin. East Branch Handsome Brook flows through Bourn Pond.

References

Rivers of New York (state)
Rivers of Delaware County, New York
Tributaries of the Susquehanna River